Clepsis diversa is a species of moth of the family Tortricidae. It is found in Nuevo León, Mexico.

The wingspan is about 13 mm. The ground colour of the forewings is olive brownish cream, with brown strigulation (fine streaks) and blackish grey groups of scales in the terminal area. The costal fold is orange and the markings are grey. The hindwings are whitish grey, but cream grey on the peripheries.

Etymology
The species name refers to the external difference to a closely related species Clepsis zoquipana.

References

Moths described in 2010
Clepsis